Soft Machine are an English jazz-rock band from Canterbury. Formed in mid-1966, the group originally consisted of drummer and vocalist Robert Wyatt, guitarist Daevid Allen, bassist and vocalist Kevin Ayers, and keyboardist Mike Ratledge. The current lineup of the band features guitarist John Etheridge (1975–1978, 1984 and since 2015), saxophonist, keyboardist Theo Travis (who joined for the first time in 2015), bassist Fred Baker (who joined for the first time in 2020) and drummer Asaf Sirkis (who joined for the first time in 2023).

History

1966–1969
Soft Machine were formed in mid-1966 by drummer and vocalist Robert Wyatt, guitarist Daevid Allen and keyboardist Mike Ratledge, who had previously worked together in the Daevid Allen Trio. Originally known as Mister Head, but soon renamed the Soft Machine, the band's inaugural lineup also featured bassist and vocalist Kevin Ayers. The group were reduced to a trio in October 1967, when Allen was denied re-entry to the UK following a tour of France, after overstaying his visa. Wyatt, Ayers and Ratledge recorded Soft Machine's self-titled debut album in April 1968, which was issued at the end of the year. Between May and July, Andy Summers joined on guitar. After a final American tour, Ayers left Soft Machine in September 1968.

Wyatt and Ratledge rebuilt Soft Machine in December 1968 with the addition of Hugh Hopper on bass, another former member of the Daevid Allen Trio who had guested on the debut album. This new lineup recorded Volume Two during early 1969, and eventually released in September that year. In October 1969 they expanded to a seven-piece with the addition of saxophonists Elton Dean and Lyn Dobson, cornet player Mark Charig and trombonist Nick Evans. Both Charig and Evans left after two months due to "financial and logistical challenges".

1970–1978

Dobson left the band in March 1970 and, after the release and promotion of Third and Fourth, Wyatt was fired in August 1971. Wyatt's replacement was initially Australian drummer Phil Howard. However, after half of the next album Fifth was recorded, Howard himself was replaced by John Marshall. After Fifth was completed, Dean also left in mid-1972 and was replaced by Karl Jenkins, a former bandmate of Marshall's in Nucleus. The group issued Six the next year, which was Hopper's last album before departing in May 1973. He was replaced by Roy Babbington, another former Nucleus member who had previously worked with Soft Machine as a session musician, playing double bass on Fourth and Fifth. In November, the group became a five-piece again with the addition of Allan Holdsworth (another Nucleus alumnus) as their first guitarist in five years. This lineup recorded the album Bundles and managed to stay together until April 1975, when Holdsworth departed. He recommended John Etheridge as his replacement. In early 1976, the band were left with no original members when Ratledge chose to leave. At this point, Jenkins stopped playing saxophone and oboe and focused solely on keyboards, while saxophonist Alan Wakeman, who had made guest appearances with the band during Ratledge's last month with them, was recruited.

After the release of Softs in 1976, Soft Machine's lineup continued to change regularly. Wakeman left in July, just after the album's release, and was replaced briefly by Ray Warleigh, who had worked with the band previously as a session player on Bundles. For a European tour later in the year, Ric Sanders joined on violin and Percy Jones took over from Babbington, who had suddenly quit. Jones declined to join on a full-time basis and was replaced by Steve Cook. Live shows in 1977 spawned the band's first completely live release, Alive & Well: Recorded in Paris. After a final show in December 1978, Soft Machine disbanded and members went their separate ways.

1978–1984: Spin-off and returns
In 1978, former Soft Machine bassist Hugh Hopper and saxophonist Elton Dean formed the spin-off band Soft Heap, with former National Health keyboardist Alan Gowen and drummer Pip Pyle. For their first tour, Pyle was temporarily replaced by Dave Sheen due to other commitments, and the group (renamed Soft Head) issued the live album Rogue Element by the end of the year. With Pyle back on drums, the band recorded a self-titled debut album in late 1978, which was issued early the following year. National Health's John Greaves later replaced Hopper and guitarist Mark Hewins joined after Gowen's death in 1981, with this second incarnation recording the live album A Veritable Centaur released in 1995. A live album recorded by the original Soft Heap lineup of Hopper, Dean, Gowen and Pyle in 1978 was released as Al Dente in 2008.

The Soft Machine name was briefly revived in 1980 for Land of Cockayne. In the summer of 1984, Soft Machine reformed once again for a short run of shows at Ronnie Scott's Jazz Club, with the band comprising John Marshall, Karl Jenkins, John Etheridge, Ray Warleigh, Paul Carmichael and Dave MacRae.

1999–2015: Later spin-off bands
Over ten years after the last Soft Machine spin-off band, Hugh Hopper and Elton Dean formed Soft Ware in 1999, adding former Soft Machine drummer John Marshall and former King Crimson contributor Keith Tippett on keyboards. The group did not release any albums, and by 2002 had changed their name to Soft Works as Tippett left and former guitarist Allan Holdsworth joined. Abracadabra, the band's only studio album, was issued in 2003. Holdsworth left again after the album's release and was replaced in October 2004 by his original replacement in Soft Machine, John Etheridge; at this point, the band renamed themselves Soft Machine Legacy. During the final Soft Works tour, Hopper and Dean also recorded an album with Japanese keyboardist Hoppy Kamiyama and drummer Tatsuya Yoshida under the name Soft Mountain. In 2004, they completed a tour with French keyboardist Sophia Domancich and drummer Simon Goubert under the name Soft Bounds.

The first lineup of Soft Machine Legacy released Live at Zaandam in 2005, followed by a self-titled debut studio album and the live video New Morning: The Paris Concert the following year. On 7 February 2006, however, Dean died following a year of "heart and liver problems". His place in the band was taken by Theo Travis, and in January 2007 the group issued their second studio album Steam. In June 2008, Hopper was diagnosed with leukemia and temporarily replaced on tour by Fred Baker of In Cahoots. He later died of the condition on 7 June 2009. As had happened when Hopper left Soft Machine in 1973, his place was taken by Roy Babbington. In 2010, the band issued the live collection Live Adventures recorded in 2009, which was followed in 2013 by their third studio release Burden of Proof.

2015 onwards: Soft Machine returns
Starting in December 2015, Theo Travis, John Etheridge, Roy Babbington and John Marshall began touring as Soft Machine, dropping "Legacy" from their name. The band released their first official studio album under the original name since 1981 in the form of Hidden Details in September 2018. In December 2020 Fred Baker replaced Babbington. In January 2023, it was announced that Asaf Sirkis had replaced newly retired John Marshall.

Members

Current band members

Former band members

Spin-off band members

Other members

Touring guests and substitutes

Session musicians

Timelines

Soft Machine timeline

Spin-off band timeline

Lineups

Soft Machine lineups

Spin-off band lineups

References

External links
Soft Machine official website

Soft Machine